Azamabad is an oldest Industrial area located in Hyderabad, India. Was established in the Nizam period. It was built during the time of the Nizams.

Industrial estate
Azamabad is home to many old companies. VST/Rahmania factory /mera/A1 fabrication, Tarannum Garden, biological lab Industries is located here, which telangana Indian government has plan to free hold industrial lease land in Azamabad area, Government order's (Go) will be issued soon.

References

Neighbourhoods in Hyderabad, India